Hòa Phong is a rural commune of Hòa Vang District, Da Nang, Vietnam.

References

Populated places in Da Nang
District capitals in Vietnam